Guillaume de La Perrière (1499/1503 in Toulouse – 1565) was one of the earliest French writers of emblem books.  His work is often associated with the French Renaissance.  La Perrière chronicled events in his home city of Toulouse. His best known work is Le Théâtre des bons engins, published in Paris in 1539, and was edited in later editions, published in 1540 and 1585.  More recently, La Perrière's Le miroir politique (1555) has received attention, thanks to the work of Michel Foucault.  Foucault identifies the work of La Perriere as belonging to Early Modern France and foreshadowing discourses of governmentality.

Images from Le Théâtre des Bons Engins
Six pages from the 1545 edition.

Works
Le Theatre des bons engins, auquel sont contenus cent emblemes (Denis Janot, 1539) 
"Les annalles de Foix" (Nicolas Vieillard, Toulouse, 1539)
Les Considerations des quatre mondes (Macé Bonhomme, 1552)
La Morosophie (Macé Bonhomme, 1553)
Le miroir politique, contenant diverses manieres de gouverner & policer les republiques, qui sont, & ont está par cy deuant: ocuure..., Paris: Pur V. Norment, & I. Bruneau; 1567.

Further reading
Alison Adams, Stephen Rawles, Alison Saunders, A Bibliography of French Emblem Books, 2 volumes, Droz, Genève, 1999–2002, pp. 364–381.
 Michel Foucault. "Governmentality."
 Guillaume de la Perrière, Le Théâtre des bons engins, introduction d'Alison Saunders, Scolar Press, 1973.
Guillaume de la Perrière, Le Théâtre des bons engins; La Morosophie, introduction d'Alison Saunders, Scolar Press, 1993.
 Stephen Rawles, « The earliest editions of Guillaume de la Perrière’s Theatre des bons engins » in Emblematica, 2.2, 1987, pp. 381–6.
Alison Saunders, « The Theatre des bons engins through English eyes » in Revue de littérature comparée, 64.4, 1990, pp. 653–73.
Géraldine Cazals, Guillaume de La Perrière (1499-1554) - Un humaniste à l’étude du politique, thèse de doctorat d’histoire du droit, Université des Sciences sociales, Toulouse I, 2003.

External links
 Biographie et reproduction en fac-simile du Théâtre des bons engins
  
 Éléments biographiques 
 Glasgow University Emblem Website including French and Italian emblem books

16th-century French philosophers
Renaissance
French Renaissance
Writers from Toulouse
Year of birth uncertain
1565 deaths
French male writers